The 2010 San Diego Padres season was the 42nd season in franchise history. On August 25, the Padres had a -game lead over the second-place San Francisco Giants, but ended up missing the playoffs as the Giants passed them in September. This was the last winning season the Padres would have until 2020.

Regular season

Many preseason predictions picked the Padres to finish the season in last place in the NL West.

On April 12, 2010, (Padres home opener) the Padres scored 17 runs—including a ten run 4th inning, making it the most runs in one half inning of baseball in Petco Park's history—against the Atlanta Braves as they went on to win 17–2. In the Padres' 1–0 win over the San Francisco Giants on April 20, San Diego won despite San Francisco's Jonathan Sánchez and Sergio Romo limiting them to just one hit, one of the very rare occasions that a team won with just one hit.

On May 13, Mat Latos threw a one hitter in a 1–0 win over the Giants.

On May 29, the Giants signed free agent outfielder Pat Burrell. Padres CEO Jeff Moorad, Burrell's friend and his former agent, would later say he regretted not recruiting Burrell to the Padres.

On May 31, the Padres played 51 games and were 2 games ahead of the Los Angeles Dodgers. They had one of the highest winning percentages in the National League despite having poor attendance and one of the worst payrolls in Major League Baseball. The Padres had one of the lowest ERA in the National League.

On June 11, the Padres had 36 wins and 25 losses. They were tied with the Los Angeles Dodgers in first place.

On June 14, in the Padres' 6–3 loss to the Toronto Blue Jays, an earthquake shook Petco Park.  Many fans and Cito Gaston, the Blue Jays' manager, felt the 5.7  earthquake, but most of the players did not feel it.  Gaston reported that he felt the dugout move side from side a little.

On June 23, the Padres won the first two games in the series against the Tampa Bay Rays. They placed  games ahead of the San Francisco Giants for first place.

On June 25, the Padres won the first game of a three-game series against the Florida Marlins, giving them 43 wins and 30 losses.  In contrast, the Padres record after 73 games in 2009 was 32 wins with 41 losses. There were constant rumors and talks about the possible trade of All-Star first baseman and Gold Glove winner Adrián González, but he remained in San Diego throughout the season.

On August 18, the Padres moved 6 games ahead of the San Francisco Giants giving them their biggest division lead of the season

On August 23, the Giants acquired outfielder Cody Ross off waivers from the Florida Marlins to block him from going to the Padres.

On August 25, the Padres were 76–49 and in first place with a  game lead. On August 26, the Padres started a 10-game losing streak by losing to the Arizona Diamondbacks 5–11. The losing streak went into the month of September and ended on September 6 when they beat the Los Angeles Dodgers 4–2.

On September 26, the Padres (87–67) had a -game lead over the Giants (87–68).

On September 30, the Padres fell 3 games behind the San Francisco Giants after losing 3 out of 4 games to the Chicago Cubs, putting them on the brink of elimination. With a 3–0 loss on October 3, the final game of the season, with the Braves beating the Phillies, the Padres were officially eliminated from playoff contention and the Giants won the division, while the Braves won the wild card spot. The Padres led the NL West for 148 days in 2010. They set team records for the fewest errors (72) and highest fielding percentage (.988) in a season.

Season standings

Record vs. opponents

Game log

|- align="center" bgcolor="#ffbbbb"
| 1 || April 5 || @ Diamondbacks || 6–3 || Haren (1–0) || Garland (0–1) ||  || 49,192 || 0–1 || Chase Field || L1 || bgcolor="ffbbbb" | -1
|- align="center" bgcolor="bbffbb"
| 2 || April 6 || @ Diamondbacks || 6–3 || Young (1–0) || Jackson (0–1) || Bell (1) || 19,177 || 1–1 || Chase Field || W1 || bgcolor="ffbbbb" | -1
|- align="center" bgcolor="#ffbbbb"
| 3 || April 7 || @ Diamondbacks || 5–3 || Boyer (1–0) || Correia (0–1) || Qualls (1) || 17,673 || 1–2 || Chase Field || L1 || bgcolor="ffbbbb" | -2
|- align="center" bgcolor="#ffbbbb"
| 4 || April 9 || @ Rockies || 7–0 || de la Rosa (1–0) || Richard (0–1) ||  || 49,509 || 1–3 || Coors Field || L2 || bgcolor="ffbbbb" | -3
|- align="center" bgcolor="bbffbb"
| 5 || April 10 || @ Rockies || 5–4 || Stauffer (1–0) || Corpas (0–1) || Bell (2) || 36,090 || 2–3 || Coors Field || W1 || bgcolor="ffbbbb" | -2
|- align="center" bgcolor="#ffbbbb"
| 6 || April 11 || @ Rockies || 4–2 || Jiménez (2–0) || Garland (0–2) || Morales (2) || 39,576 || 2–4 || Coors Field || L1 || bgcolor="ffbbbb" | -3
|- align="center" bgcolor="bbffbb"
| 7 || April 12 || Braves || 17–2 || Correia (1–1) || Jurrjens (0–1) ||  || 42,843 || 3–4 || Petco Park || W1 || bgcolor="ffbbbb" | -3
|- align="center" bgcolor="#ffbbbb"
| 8 || April 14 || Braves || 6–1 || Hanson (1–1) || Richard (0–2) ||  || 24,969 || 3–5 || Petco Park || L1 || bgcolor="ffbbbb" | -3½
|- align="center" bgcolor="#ffbbbb"
| 9 || April 15 || Braves || 6–2 || Hudson (1–0) || Latos (0–1) ||  || 16,356 || 3–6 || Petco Park || L2 || bgcolor="ffbbbb" | -4
|- align="center" bgcolor="bbffbb"
| 10 || April 16 || Diamondbacks || 6–3 || Bell (1–0) || Gutiérrez (0–1) ||  || 26,632 || 4–6 || Petco Park || W1 || bgcolor="ffbbbb" | -3
|- align="center" bgcolor="bbffbb"
| 11 || April 17 || Diamondbacks || 5–0 || Correia (2–1) || Benson (0–1) ||  || 31,324 || 5–6 || Petco Park || W2 || bgcolor="ffbbbb" | -3
|- align="center" bgcolor="bbffbb"
| 12 || April 18 || Diamondbacks || 5–3 || Mujica (1–0) || Heilman (0–1) || Bell (3) || 20,634 || 6–6 || Petco Park || W3 || bgcolor="ffbbbb" | -2
|- align="center" bgcolor="bbffbb"
| 13 || April 19 || Giants || 3 – 2 (10) || Stauffer (2–0) || Affeldt (2–2) ||  || 17,087 || 7–6 || Petco Park || W4 || bgcolor="ffbbbb" | -1
|- align="center" bgcolor="bbffbb"
| 14 || April 20 || Giants || 1–0 || Latos (1–1) || Sánchez (1–1) || Bell (4) || 17,822 || 8–6 || Petco Park || W5 || bgcolor="f2f2f2" | 0
|- align="center" bgcolor="bbffbb"
| 15 || April 21 || Giants || 5–2 || Garland (1–2) || Wellemeyer (0–3) ||  || 14,906 || 9–6 || Petco Park || W6 || bgcolor="bbffbb" | +1
|- align="center" bgcolor="bbffbb"
| 16 || April 23 || @ Reds || 10–4 || Correia (3–1) || Arroyo (0–2) ||  || 15,183 || 10–6 || Great American Ball Park || W7 || bgcolor="bbffbb" | +1
|- align="center" bgcolor="bbffbb"
| 17 || April 24 || @ Reds || 5–0 || LeBlanc (1–0) || Cueto (0–1) ||  || 19,999 || 11–6 || Great American Ball Park || W8 || bgcolor="bbffbb" | +1
|- align="center" bgcolor="#ffbbbb"
| 18 || April 25 || @ Reds || 5–4 || Rhodes (1–1) || Adams (0–1) || Cordero (7) ||17,694  || 11–7 || Great American Ball Park || L1 || bgcolor="bbffbb" | +1
|- align="center" bgcolor="#ffbbbb"
| 19 || April 26 || @ Marlins || 10–1 || Johnson (2–1) || Latos (1–2) ||  || 10,924 || 11–8 || Sun Life Stadium || L2 || bgcolor="f2f2f2" | 0
|- align="center" bgcolor="bbffbb"
| 20 || April 27 || @ Marlins || 4–1 || Garland (2–2) || Sánchez (1–2) || Bell (5) || 11,613 || 12–8 || Sun Life Stadium || W1 || bgcolor="f2f2f2" | 0
|- align="center" bgcolor="bbffbb"
| 21 || April 28 || @ Marlins || 6–4 || Correia (4–1) || Robertson (2–2) || Bell (6) || 16,310 || 13–8 || Sun Life Stadium || W2 || bgcolor="bbffbb" | +1
|- align="center" bgcolor="bbffbb"
| 22 || April 29 || Brewers || 9–0 || LeBlanc (2–0) || Davis (0–3) ||  || 16,696 || 14–8 || Petco Park || W3 || bgcolor="bbffbb" | +1½
|- align="center" bgcolor="bbffbb"
| 23 || April 30 || Brewers || 3–0 || Richard (1–2) || Bush (1–2) || Bell (7) || 29,366 || 15–8 || Petco Park || W4 || bgcolor="bbffbb" | +1½
|-

|- align="center" bgcolor="#ffbbbb"
| 24 || May 1 || Brewers || 2–1 || Gallardo (3–2) || Latos  (1–3) || Hoffman (4)  || 25,619 || 15–9 || Petco Park || L1 || bgcolor="bbffbb" | +½
|- align="center" bgcolor="bbffbb"
| 25 || May 2 || Brewers || 8–0 || Garland  (3–2) || Wolf  (2–2) ||  || 20,074  || 16–9 || Petco Park || W1 || bgcolor="bbffbb" | +1½
|- align="center" bgcolor="#ffbbbb"
| 26 || May 3 || Rockies || 5–2 ||Jiménez  (6–0) || Correia  (4–2) ||  || 15,052 || 16–10 || Petco Park || L1 || bgcolor="bbffbb" | +1
|- align="center" bgcolor="bbffbb"
| 27 || May 4 || Rockies || 3–2 ||Bell  (2–0) || Morales  (0–3) ||  || 16,329  || 17–10 || Petco Park || W1 || bgcolor="bbffbb" | +1
|- align="center" bgcolor="#ffbbbb"
| 28 || May 5 || Rockies || 6–5 || Corpas  (1–1) || Stauffer  (2–1) ||  ||17,121  || 17–11 || Petco Park || L1 || bgcolor="f2f2f2" | 0
|- align="center" bgcolor="bbffbb"
| 29 || May 7 || @ Astros || 7–0 ||Latos  (2–3) || Norris  (1–4) ||  ||25,586  || 18–11 || Minute Maid Park || W1 || bgcolor="bbffbb" | +½
|- align="center" bgcolor="bbffbb"
| 30 || May 8 || @ Astros || 2–1 ||Garland  (4–2) || Paulino  (0–5) ||Bell (8)  ||27,038  || 19–11 || Minute Maid Park || W2 || bgcolor="bbffbb" | +1½
|- align="center" bgcolor="#ffbbbb"
| 31 || May 9 || @ Astros || 4–3 || Lyon  (2–1) ||Webb  (0–1) ||  ||23,526  || 19–12 || Minute Maid Park || L1 || bgcolor="bbffbb" | +½
|- align="center" bgcolor="bbffbb"
| 32 || May 11 || @ Giants || 3–2 ||Webb  (1–1) || Zito  (5–1) ||Bell (9)  ||33,249  || 20–12 || AT&T Park || W1 || bgcolor="bbffbb" | +1½
|- align="center" bgcolor="bbffbb"
| 33 || May 12 || @ Giants || 5–2 ||Richard  (2–2) ||Cain  (2–2) ||Bell (10)  ||30,924  || 21–12 || AT&T Park || W2 || bgcolor="bbffbb" | +2½
|- align="center" bgcolor="bbffbb"
| 34 || May 13 || @ Giants || 1–0 ||Latos  (3–3) ||Sánchez  (2–3) ||  ||32,861  || 22–12 || AT&T Park || W3 || bgcolor="bbffbb" | +3½
|- align="center" bgcolor="#ffbbbb"
| 35 || May 14 || Dodgers || 4–3 || Weaver  (2–1) ||Gregerson  (0–1) ||Broxton (5)  ||42,056  || 22–13 || Petco Park || L1 || bgcolor="bbffbb" | +2½
|- align="center" bgcolor="#ffbbbb"
| 36 || May 15 || Dodgers || 4–1 || Kershaw  (3–2) ||Correia  (4–3) ||Broxton (6)  ||42,436  || 22–14 || Petco Park || L2 || bgcolor="bbffbb" | +1½
|- align="center" bgcolor="#ffbbbb"
| 37 || May 16 || Dodgers || 1–0 ||Billingsley  (4–2) ||LeBlanc  (2–1) ||Broxton (7)  ||42,327  || 22–15 || Petco Park || L3 || bgcolor="bbffbb" | +½
|- align="center" bgcolor="bbffbb"
| 38 || May 17 || Giants || 3–1 ||Richard  (3–2) ||Cain  (2–3) ||Bell (11)  ||20,558  || 23–15 || Petco Park || W1 || bgcolor="bbffbb" | +1½
|- align="center" bgcolor="#ffbbbb"
| 39 || May 18 || Giants || 7 – 6 (12) ||Runzler  (2–0) ||Ramos  (0–1) ||Wilson (10)  ||19,565  || 23–16 || Petco Park || L1 || bgcolor="bbffbb" | +½
|- align="center" bgcolor="bbffbb"
| 40 || May 19 || @ Dodgers || 10–5 ||Garland  (5–2) ||Ortiz  (1–2) ||  ||40,138  || 24–16 || Dodger Stadium || W1 || bgcolor="bbffbb" | +1½
|- align="center" bgcolor="#ffbbbb"
| 41 || May 20 || @ Dodgers || 4–1 ||Kershaw  (4–2) ||Correia  (4–4) ||Broxton (8)  ||38,856  || 24–17 || Dodger Stadium || L1 || bgcolor="bbffbb" | +1
|- align="center" bgcolor="#ffbbbb"
| 42 || May 21 || @ Mariners || 15–8 || Lee  (2–2) ||LeBlanc  (2–2) ||  ||24,139  || 24–18 || Safeco Field || L2 || bgcolor="f2f2f2" | 0
|- align="center" bgcolor="bbffbb"
| 43 || May 22 || @ Mariners || 2–1 ||Richard  (4–2) ||Snell  (0–3) ||Bell (12)  ||28,670  || 25–18 || Safeco Field || W1 || bgcolor="f2f2f2" | 0
|- align="center" bgcolor="bbffbb"
| 44 || May 23 || @ Mariners || 8–1 ||Latos  (4–3) ||Hernández  (2–4) ||  ||33,315  || 26–18 || Safeco Field || W2 || bgcolor="bbffbb" | +1
|- align="center" bgcolor="bbffbb"
| 45 || May 25 || Cardinals || 1–0 ||Garland  (6–2) ||Wainwright  (6–3) ||Bell (13)  ||18,236  || 27–18 || Petco Park || W3 || bgcolor="bbffbb" | +2
|- align="center" bgcolor="bbffbb"
| 46 || May 26 || Cardinals || 2 – 1 (13)  ||Mujica  (2–0) ||Boggs  (0–2) ||  ||19,752  || 28–18 || Petco Park || W4 || bgcolor="bbffbb" | +2
|- align="center" bgcolor="#ffbbbb"
| 47 || May 27 || Cardinals || 8–3 ||Walters  (1–0) ||LeBlanc  (2–3) ||  ||20,583  || 28–19 || Petco Park || L1 || bgcolor="bbffbb" | +2
|- align="center" bgcolor="#ffbbbb"
| 48 || May 28 || Nationals || 5–3 ||Lannan  (2–2) ||Richard  (4–3) ||Capps (17)  ||23,468  || 28–20 || Petco Park || L2 || bgcolor="bbffbb" | +1
|- align="center" bgcolor="bbffbb"
| 49 || May 29 || Nationals || 4–2 ||Latos  (5–3) ||Martin  (0–1) ||Bell (14)  ||25,956  || 29–20 || Petco Park || W1 || bgcolor="bbffbb" | +2
|- align="center" bgcolor="bbffbb"
| 50 || May 30 || Nationals || 3–2 ||Gregerson  (1–1) ||Burnett  (0–3) ||  ||28,591  || 30–20 || Petco Park || W2 || bgcolor="bbffbb" | +2
|- align="center" bgcolor="bbffbb"
| 51 || May 31 || Mets || 18–6 ||Correia (5–4) ||Takahashi  (4–2) ||  ||20,023  || 31–20 || Petco Park || W3 || bgcolor="bbffbb" | +2
|- 

|- align="center" bgcolor="ffbbbb"
| 52 || June 1 || Mets || 4–2 ||Pelfrey  (8–1) ||LeBlanc  (2–4) ||Rodríguez (10)  ||17,393  || 31–21 || Petco Park || L1 || bgcolor="bbffbb" | +1
|- align="center" bgcolor="bbffbb"
| 53 || June 2 || Mets || 5 – 1 (11) ||Webb  (2–1) ||Valdés  (2–2) ||  ||15.880  || 32–21 || Petco Park || W1 || bgcolor="bbffbb" | +1
|- align="center" bgcolor="ffbbbb"
| 54 || June 4 || @ Phillies || 3–2 ||Halladay  (8–3) ||Latos  (5–4) ||Lidge (2)  ||45,080  || 32–22 || Citizens Bank Park || L1 || bgcolor="bbffbb" | +½
|- align="center" bgcolor="ffbbbb"
| 55 || June 5 || @ Phillies || 6–2 ||Moyer  (6–5) ||Garland  (6–3) ||  ||45,353  || 32–23 || Citizens Bank Park || L2 || bgcolor="bbffbb" | +½
|- align="center" bgcolor="bbffbb"
| 56 || June 6 || @ Phillies || 6 – 5 (10) ||Adams  (1–1) ||Báez  (2–2) ||Bell (15)  ||44,852  || 33–23 || Citizens Bank Park || W1 || bgcolor="bbffbb" | +½
|- align="center" bgcolor="bbffbb"
| 57 || June 7 || @ Phillies || 3–1 ||LeBlanc  (3–4) ||Hamels  (5–5) ||Bell (16)  ||45,398  || 34–23 || Citizens Bank Park || W2 || bgcolor="bbffbb" | +½
|- align="center" bgcolor="ffbbbb"
| 58 || June 8 || @ Mets || 2 – 1 (11) ||Dessens  (1–1) ||Mujica  (2–1) ||  ||30,086  || 34–24 || Citi Field || L1 || bgcolor="bbcaff" | -½
|- align="center" bgcolor="bbbbbb"
| || June 9 || @ Mets || colspan=6 |Postponed (rain); Rescheduled for June 10 || Citi Field || || bgcolor="bbcaff" | -1
|- align="center" bgcolor="bbffbb"
| 59 || June 10 || @ Mets || 4–2 ||Latos  (6–4) ||Santana  (4–3) ||Bell (17)  ||32,365  || 35–24 || Citi Field || W1 || bgcolor="bbcaff" | -½
|- align="center" bgcolor="ffbbbb"
| 60 || June 10 || @ Mets || 3–0 ||Niese  (3–2) ||Garland  (6–4) ||  ||28,072  || 35–25 || Citi Field || L1 || bgcolor="bbcaff" | -1
|- align="center" bgcolor="bbffbb"
| 61 || June 11 || Mariners || 4–3 ||Thatcher  (1–0) ||Aardsma  (0–4) ||  ||20,049  || 36–25 || Petco Park || W1 || bgcolor="f2f2f2" | 0
|- align="center" bgcolor="bbffbb"
| 62 || June 12 || Mariners || 7–1 ||LeBlanc  (4–4) ||Lee  (4–3) ||  ||30,019  || 37–25 || Petco Park || W2 || bgcolor="bbffbb" | +1
|- align="center" bgcolor="ffbbbb"
| 63 || June 13 || Mariners || 4–2 ||Hernández  (4–5) ||Gregerson  (1–2) ||Aardsma (13)  ||23,429  || 37–26 || Petco Park || L1 || bgcolor="bbffbb" | +1
|- align="center" bgcolor="ffbbbb"
| 64 || June 14 || Blue Jays || 6–3 ||Marcum  (6–3) ||Garland  (6–5) ||Gregg (16)  ||16,542  || 37–27 || Petco Park || L2 || bgcolor="bbffbb" | +½
|- align="center" bgcolor="bbffbb"
| 65 || June 15 || Blue Jays || 8–2 ||Latos  (7–4) ||Cecil  (7–3) ||  ||15,266  || 38–27 || Petco Park || W1 || bgcolor="bbffbb" | +½
|- align="center" bgcolor="ffbbbb"
| 66 || June 16 || Blue Jays || 7–1 ||Romero  (6–3) ||Correia  (5–5) ||  ||16,050  || 38–28 || Petco Park || L1 || bgcolor="bbcaff" | -½
|- align="center"  bgcolor="bbffbb"
| 67 || June 18 || Orioles || 3–2 ||Bell  (3–0) ||Hernandez  (2–6) ||  ||25,167  || 39–28 || Petco Park || W1 || bgcolor="bbffbb" | +1
|- align="center"  bgcolor="ffbbbb"
| 68 || June 19 || Orioles || 5–4 ||Millwood  (1–8) ||Richard  (4–4) ||Simón (7)  ||28,138  || 39–29 || Petco Park || L1 || bgcolor="bbffbb" | +1
|- align="center" bgcolor="bbffbb"
| 69 || June 20 || Orioles || 9–4 ||Garland  (7–5) ||Arrieta  (2–1) ||  ||28,029  || 40–29 || Petco Park || W1 || bgcolor="bbffbb" | +1½
|- align="center" bgcolor="bbffbb"
| 70 || June 22 || @ Rays || 2–1 ||Latos  (8–4) ||Davis  (5–8) ||Bell (18)  ||14,650  || 41–29 || Tropicana Field || W2 || bgcolor="bbffbb" | +1½
|- align="center" bgcolor="bbffbb"
| 71 || June 23 || @ Rays || 5–4 ||Gregerson  (2–2) ||Shields  (6–7) ||Bell (19)  ||15,809  || 42–29 || Tropicana Field || W3 || bgcolor="bbffbb" | +2½
|- align="center" bgcolor="ffbbbb"
| 72 || June 24 || @ Rays || 5–3 ||Garza  (8–5) ||LeBlanc  (4–5) ||Soriano (17)  ||21,877  || 42–30 || Tropicana Field || L1 || bgcolor="bbffbb" | +2½
|- align="center" bgcolor="bbffbb"
| 73 || June 25 || @ Marlins || 3–0 ||Richard  (5–4) ||Volstad  (4–7) ||Bell (20)  ||16,718  || 43–30 || Sun Life Stadium || W1 || bgcolor="bbffbb" | +2½
|- align="center" bgcolor="bbffbb"
| 74 || June 26 || @ Marlins || 2–1 ||Garland  (8–5) ||Johnson  (8–3) ||Bell (21)  ||22,495  || 44–30 || Sun Life Stadium || W2 || bgcolor="bbffbb" | +3½
|- align="center" bgcolor="bbffbb"
| 75 || June 27 || @ Marlins || 4–2 ||Webb  (3–1) ||Sanches  (0–1) ||Gregerson (1)  ||16,044  || 45–30 || Sun Life Stadium || W3 || bgcolor="bbffbb" | +4½
|- align="center" bgcolor="ffbbbb"
| 76 || June 28 || Rockies || 10–6 ||Jiménez  (14–1) ||Correia  (5–6) ||  ||21,018  || 45–31 || Petco Park || L1 || bgcolor="bbffbb" | +4
|- align="center" bgcolor="ffbbbb"
| 77 || June 29 || Rockies || 6–3 ||Hammel  (6–3) ||LeBlanc  (4–6) ||Street (1)  ||21,196  || 45–32 || Petco Park || L2 || bgcolor="bbffbb" | +3
|- align="center" bgcolor="bbffbb"
| 78 || June 30 || Rockies || 13–3 ||Richard  (6–4) ||Francis  (2–3) ||  ||24,519  || 46–32 || Petco Park || W1 || bgcolor="bbffbb" | +3
|-

|- align="center" bgcolor="#ffbbbb"
| 79 || July 1 || Astros || 6 – 3 (10) || Sampson (1–0) || Gregerson (2–3) || Lindstrom (19) || 18,618 || 46–33 || Petco Park || L1 || bgcolor="bbffbb" | +2½
|- align="center" bgcolor="bbffbb"
| 80 || July 2 || Astros || 3–0 || Latos (9–4) || Lyon (5–2) || Bell (22) || 30,691 || 47–33 || Petco Park || W1 || bgcolor="bbffbb" | +1½
|- align="center" bgcolor="bbffbb"
| 81 || July 3 || Astros || 1–0 || Adams (2–1) || Chacín (1–1) || Bell (23) || 40,042 || 48–33 || Petco Park || W2 || bgcolor="bbffbb" | +3½
|- align="center" bgcolor="bbffbb"
| 82 || July 4 || Astros || 3–2 || Bell (4–0) || Lyon (5–3) ||  || 23,498 || 49–33 || Petco Park || W3 || bgcolor="bbffbb" | +3½
|- align="center" bgcolor="#ffbbbb"
| 83 || July 6 || @ Nationals || 6–5 || Capps (3–3) || Gregerson (2–4) ||  || 14,039 || 49–34 || Nationals Park || L1 || bgcolor="bbffbb" | +3
|- align="center" bgcolor="#ffbbbb"
| 84 || July 7 || @ Nationals || 7–6 || Martin (1–4) || Garland (8–6) || Capps (23) || 13,762 || 49–35 || Nationals Park || L2 || bgcolor="bbffbb" | +3
|- align="center" bgcolor="#bbffbb"
| 85 || July 8 || @ Nationals || 7–1 || Latos (10–4) || Atilano (6–6) ||  || 17,364 || 50–35 || Nationals Park || W1 || bgcolor="bbffbb" | +3
|- align="center" bgcolor="#ffbbbb"
| 86 || July 9 || @ Rockies || 10–8 || Belisle (4–3) || Gregerson (2–5) || Street (4) || 36,123 || 50–36 || Coors Field || L1 || bgcolor="bbffbb" | +2
|- align="center" bgcolor="#ffbbbb"
| 87 || July 10 || @ Rockies || 4–2 || Hammel (7–3) || LeBlanc (4–7) || Street (5) || 45,069 || 50–37 || Coors Field || L2 || bgcolor="bbffbb" | +1
|- align="center" bgcolor="bbffbb"
| 88 || July 11 || @ Rockies || 9–7 || Gregerson (3–5) || Belisle (4–4) || Bell (24) || 40,460 || 51–37 || Coors Field || W1 || bgcolor="bbffbb" | +2
|- align="center" bgcolor="bbcaff"
|colspan="3" bgcolor="#bbcaff"| July 13: All-Star Game (NL wins—Box) || 3–1 || Capps (WAS) || Hughes (NYY) || Broxton (LAD) || 45,408 || || Angel Stadium of Anaheim || colspan=2 |  Anaheim, CA
|- align="center" bgcolor="bbffbb"
| 89 || July 16 || Diamondbacks || 12–1 || Garland (9–6) || Haren (7–8) ||  || 33,177 || 52–37 || Petco Park || W1 || bgcolor="bbffbb" | +3
|- align="center" bgcolor="bbffbb"
| 90 || July 17 || Diamondbacks || 8–5 || Richard (7–4) || López (5–8) || Bell (25) || 40,011 || 53–37 || Petco Park || W2 || bgcolor="bbffbb" | +3½
|- align="center" bgcolor="bbffbb"
| 91 || July 18 || Diamondbacks || 6–4 || Correia (6–6) || Jackson (6–8) || Bell (26) || 25,363 || 54–37 || Petco Park || W3 || bgcolor="bbffbb" | +4
|- align="center" bgcolor="#ffbbbb"
| 92 || July 20 || @ Braves || 4–1 || Jurrjens (3–3) || LeBlanc (4–8) || Wagner (22) || 30,621 || 54–38 || Turner Field || L1 || bgcolor="bbffbb" | +3
|- align="center" bgcolor="bbffbb"
| 93 || July 21 || @ Braves || 6 – 4 (12) || Stauffer (3–3) || Medlen (6–2) || Bell (27) || 30,039  || 55–38 || Turner Field || W1 || bgcolor="bbffbb" |+4 
|- align="center" bgcolor="#ffbbbb"
| 94 || July 22 || @ Braves || 8–0 ||Hudson (10–5) ||Richard (7–5) ||  || 26,450 ||55–39 || Turner Field || L1||bgcolor="bbffbb" |+3
|- align="center" bgcolor="bbffbb"
| 95 || July 23 || @ Pirates || 5–3 ||Correia (7–6)  ||Maholm (6–8) ||Bell (28)  ||18,611  ||56–39 || PNC Park||W1||bgcolor="bbffbb" |+3
|- align="center" bgcolor="bbffbb"
| 96 || July 24 || @ Pirates || 9–2 || Latos (11–4) || Karstens (2–6)||||36,967 ||57–39 || PNC Park||W2||bgcolor="bffbb" |+3
|- align="center" bgcolor="bbffbb"
| 97 || July 25 || @ Pirates || 6–3 ||LeBlanc (5–8)  ||Lincoln (1–4)  ||Bell (29)  ||18,800  ||58–39 || PNC Park|| W3 || bgcolor="bbffbb" |+3
|- align="center" bgcolor="#ffbbbb"
| 98 || July 27 || Dodgers || 2–0 ||Billingsley (9–5) || Garland (9–7) ||Broxton (20)  ||38,428  ||58–40 || Petco Park || L1 || bgcolor="bbffbb" | +2½ 
|- align="center" bgcolor="bbffbb"
| 99 || July 28 || Dodgers || 6–1 || Richard (8–5) ||Kuroda (8–9)||  ||40,188 ||59–40 || Petco Park ||W1 || bgcolor="bffbb" | +2½  
|- align="center" bgcolor="bbffbb"
| 100 || July 29 || Dodgers || 3–2 ||Bell (5–0) ||Sherrill (1–2) 
|| ||42,075  ||60–40 || Petco Park || W2 || bgcolor="bbffbb" |+3½  
|- align="center" bgcolor="#ffbbbb"
| 101 || July 30 || Marlins || 4–2 ||Volstad (5–8)  || LeBlanc (5–9)||Núñez (25) ||30,478  ||60–41 || Petco Park || L1 || bgcolor="bbffbb" |+2½
|- align="center" bgcolor="#ffbbbb"
| 102 || July 31 || Marlins || 6–3 ||Nolasco (12–7)  ||Correia (7–7) ||Núñez (26)  ||42,072 ||60–42 || Petco Park || L2 || bgcolor="bbffbb" |+1½
|-

|-
|- align="center" bgcolor="bbffbb"
| 103 || August 1 || Marlins || 5–4 ||Garland (10–7) ||Johnson (10–4) ||Bell (30)  ||27,560  ||61–42 || Petco Park || W1 ||bgcolor="bbffbb" |+1½
|- align="center" bgcolor="bbffbb"
| 104 || August 2 || @ Dodgers || 10–5 ||Richard (9–5)  ||Kuroda (8–10)  || ||40,860  ||62–42 || Dodger Stadium || W2 ||bgcolor="bbffbb" |+2
|- align="center" bgcolor="#ffbbbb"
| 105 || August 3 || @ Dodgers ||2–1 ||Lilly (4–8) ||Latos (11–5) ||Broxton (21)  ||38,886  ||62–43|| Dodger Stadium|| L1 ||bgcolor="bbffbb" |+1
|- align="center" bgcolor="#ffbbbb"
| 106 || August 4 || @ Dodgers || 9–0 ||Padilla (5–3) ||LeBlanc (5–10) ||  ||48,988  ||62–44  || Dodger Stadium|| L2 || bgcolor="bbffbb" |+1
|- align="center" bgcolor="bbffbb"
| 107 || August 5 || @ Dodgers || 5–0 ||Correia (8–7)  ||Billingsley (9–6)  ||Bell (31) ||44,739  ||63–44 || Dodger Stadium ||W1 ||bgcolor="bbffbb" |+2
|- align="center" bgcolor="#ffbbbb"
| 108 || August 6 || @ Diamondbacks || 2–1 ||Hudson (3–1)  || Garland (10–8) ||Heilman (5)  ||22,168  ||63–45 || Chase Field|| L1 ||bgcolor="bbffbb" |+1
|- align="center" bgcolor="#ffbbbb"
| 109 || August 7 || @ Diamondbacks || 6–5 || Heilman (3–3) || Gregerson (3–6) ||  ||48,946  ||63–46 || Chase Field|| L2 ||bgcolor="bbffbb" |+1
|- align="center" bgcolor="bbffbb"
| 110 || August 8 || @ Diamondbacks || 10–1 ||Latos (12–5)  ||Saunders (7–11)  || ||27,856 ||64–46 || Chase Field|| W1 ||bgcolor="bbffbb" |+2
|- align="center" bgcolor="bbffbb"
| 111 || August 10 || Pirates || 4–1 ||LeBlanc (6–10)  ||Karstens (2–8)  ||Bell (32)  ||23,249  ||65–46 || Petco Park|| W2 ||bgcolor="bbffbb" |+2½
|- align="center" bgcolor="bbffbb"
| 112 || August 11 || Pirates ||8–5 ||Correia (9–7)  ||McDonald (1–2)||Bell (33)  ||28,335  ||66–46 || Petco Park|| W3 ||bgcolor="bbffbb" |+2½
|- align="center" bgcolor="bbffbb"
| 113 || August 12 || Pirates || 3–0 ||Garland (11–8)   ||Duke (5–11)  ||Bell (34)  ||25,897  ||67–46 || Petco Park || W4 ||bgcolor="bbffbb"|+2½
|- align="center" bgcolor="bbffbb"
| 114 || August 13 || @ Giants || 3–2 ||Richard (10–5)  ||Sánchez (8–8)  ||Bell (35)  ||42,722 ||68–46 || AT&T Park || W5 ||bgcolor="bbffbb"|+3½
|- align="center" bgcolor="#ffbbbb"
| 115 || August 14 || @ Giants || 3 – 2 (11) || Casilla (4–2) || Stauffer (3–2) ||  || 42,293  || 68–47 || AT&T Park || L1 ||bgcolor="bbffbb"|+2½
|- align="center" bgcolor="bbffbb"
| 116 || August 15 || @ Giants || 8–2 ||LeBlanc (7–10)  ||Lincecum (11–7)  ||  ||42,834 ||69–47  || AT&T Park || W1 ||bgcolor="bbffbb"|+3½
|- align="center" bgcolor="bbffbb"
| 117 || August 16 || @ Cubs || 9–5 || Correia (10–7) || Gorzelanny (6–7)  ||  ||36,814  ||70–47 || Wrigley Field || W2 || bgcolor="bbffbb"|+4
|- align="center" bgcolor="bbffbb"
| 118 || August 17 || @ Cubs || 1–0 ||Garland (12–8) ||Wells (5–11)  ||Bell (36)  ||33,664  || 71–47 || Wrigley Field || W3|| bgcolor="bbffbb"|+5
|- align="center" bgcolor="bbffbb"
| 119 || August 18 || @ Cubs || 5–1 ||Richard (11–5) ||Coleman (0–1)  ||  ||33,267  ||72–47 || Wrigley Field || W4||bgcolor="bbffbb"|+6
|- align="center" bgcolor="bbffbb"
| 120 || August 19 || @ Cubs || 5–3 ||Latos (13–5) ||Marshall (6–4) ||Bell (37)  ||30,687 ||73–47 || Wrigley Field || W5 ||bgcolor="bbffbb"|+6
|- align="center" bgcolor="#ffbbbb"
| 121 || August 20 || @ Brewers || 10–6 || Capuano (2–2) || LeBlanc (7–11) ||  ||27,976 ||73–48 || Miller Park || L1 ||bgcolor="bbffbb"|+5
|- align="center" bgcolor="#ffbbbb"
| 122 || August 21 || @ Brewers || 6–5 ||McClendon (1–0)  ||Correia (10–8)  ||Axford (19)  || 40,056 ||73–49  || Miller Park || L2 ||bgcolor="bbffbb"|+5
|- align="center" bgcolor="bbffbb"
| 123 || August 22 || @ Brewers || 7–3 || Garland (13–8)||Parra (3–10) ||  ||32,126 ||74–48 || Miller Park|| W1 ||bgcolor="bbffbb"|+6
|- align="center" bgcolor="bbffbb"
| 124 || August 24 || Diamondbacks || 5-0 || Richard (12-5) ||López (5–12)  ||  ||20,075   || 75-48 || Petco Park || W2 ||bgcolor="bbffbb"|+5½
|- align="center" bgcolor="bbffbb"
| 125 || August 25 || Diamondbacks || 9-3 ||LeBlanc (8–11)  ||Saunders (7–14)  ||  || 21,966  || 76-49 || Petco Park ||| W3 ||bgcolor="bbffbb"|+6½
|- align="center" bgcolor="#ffbbbb"
| 126 || August 26 || Diamondbacks || 11-5 ||Kennedy (8–9) ||Correia (10–9) ||   || 20,983  || 76-50 || Petco Park || L1 ||bgcolor="bbffbb"|+6
|- align="center" bgcolor="#ffbbbb"
| 127 || August 27 || Phillies || 3-2 (12) ||Durbin (4-1) ||Frieri (0-1) ||  ||34,233  || 76-51 || Petco Park || L2 ||bgcolor="bbffbb"|+6
|- align="center" bgcolor="#ffbbbb"
| 128 || August 28 || Phillies || 3-1 ||Blanton (6-6)    || Garland (13-9) || Lidge (18)  ||37,424  || 76-52 || Petco Park || L3 ||bgcolor="bbffbb"|+6
|- align="center" bgcolor="#ffbbbb"
| 129 || August 29 || Phillies || 5-0 || Hamels (8-10) || Richard (12-6) ||  || 30,528 || 76-53 || Petco Park || L4 ||bgcolor="bbffbb"|+5
|- align="center" bgcolor="#ffbbbb"
| 130 || August 30 || @ Diamondbacks || 7-2 ||Saunders (8-14)  || LeBlanc (8-12)  ||  || 17,829 || 76-54 || Chase Field || L5 ||bgcolor="bbffbb"|+5
|- align="center" bgcolor="#ffbbbb"
| 131 || August 31 || @ Diamondbacks || 7-4 || Kennedy (9-9)  || Correia (10-10) ||Gutiérrez (5) || 16,250 || 76-55  || Chase Field || L6 ||bgcolor="bbffbb"|+4
|-align="center"
|- align="center"
|-

|-
|- align="center" bgcolor="#ffbbbb"
| 132 || September 1 || @ Diamondbacks || 5-2 || Enright (6-2)   || Gregerson (3-7)  ||Gutiérrez (6)  || 17,599 || 76-56 || Chase Field ||L7||bgcolor="bbffbb"|+3
|- align="center" bgcolor="#ffbbbb"
| 133 || September 3 || Rockies || 4-3 ||Cook (5-8)  ||Luebke (0-1)  ||Street (14)  || 21,877  || 76-57 || Petco Park ||L8||bgcolor="bbffbb"|+3
|- align="center" bgcolor="#ffbbbb"
| 134 || September 4 || Rockies || 6-2 ||Hammel (10-7)  || Garland (13-10)  || || 26,168 || 76-58 || Petco Park ||L9||bgcolor="bbffbb"|+2
|- align="center" bgcolor="#ffbbbb"
| 135 || September 5 || Rockies || 4-2 ||de la Rosa (6-4)   || Stauffer (3-3) ||Street (15)  || 23,250  || 76-59 || Petco Park || L10||bgcolor="bbffbb"|+1
|- align="center" bgcolor="bbffbb"
| 136 || September 6 || Dodgers || 4-2 || Adams (3-1) ||Padilla (6-5)   || Bell (38)  ||23,574  || 77-59 || Petco Park || W1||bgcolor="bbffbb"|+1
|- align="center" bgcolor="bbffbb"
| 137 || September 7 || Dodgers || 2-1 || Latos (14-5) || Kershaw (11-10) ||Bell (39)  ||20,071  || 78-59 || Petco Park || W2||bgcolor="bbffbb"|+1
|- align="center" bgcolor="bbffbb"
| 138 || September 8 || Dodgers || 4-0 ||Luebke (1-1)  ||Billingsley (11-9)  ||Gregerson (2)  ||20,851 || 79-59 || Petco Park || W3||bgcolor="bbffbb"|+2
|- align="center" bgcolor="#ffbbbb"
| 139 || September 9 || Giants || 7-3 || Cain (11-10)  ||Garland (13-11)  ||  ||28,456 || 79-60 || Petco Park ||  L1||bgcolor="bbffbb"|+1
|- align="center" bgcolor="#ffbbbb"
| 140 || September 10 || Giants || 1-0 || Casilla (7-2)  || Richard (12-7)  || Wilson (12) || 33,662  || 79-61  || Petco Park ||  L2||bgcolor="f2f2f2"|0
|- align="center" bgcolor="bbffbb"
| 141 || September 11 || Giants || 1-0 || Stauffer (4-3)   || Bumgarner (5-5) ||Bell (40)  || 41,123  || 80-61 || Petco Park || W1||bgcolor="bbffbb"|+1
|- align="center" bgcolor="#ffbbbb"
| 142 || September 12 || Giants || 6-1 || Lincecum (14-9) || Latos (14-6)  || || 33,876 || 80-62 || Petco Park ||  L1 || bgcolor="f2f2f2"|0
|- align="center" bgcolor="bbffbb"
| 143 || September 13 || @ Rockies || 6-4 ||Frieri (1-1)  || Francis (4-5)  || Bell (41) || 34,089 || 81-62 || Coors Field || W1 || bgcolor="bbffbb"|+½
|- align="center" bgcolor="bbffbb"
| 144 || September 14 || @ Rockies || 7-6 ||Garland (14-11)  || Hammel (10-8) || Bell (42) || 40,532 || 82-62 || Coors Field || W2 || bgcolor="bbffbb"|+1½
|- align="center" bgcolor="#ffbbbb"
| 145 || September 15 || @ Rockies || 9-6 || de la Rosa (8-4) || Richard (12-8)  || Street (19) || 30,218 || 82-63 || Coors Field || L1 || bgcolor="bbffbb"|+½
|- align="center" bgcolor="#ffbbbb"
| 146 || September 16 || @ Cardinals || 4-0 || Westbrook (8-10) || Stauffer (4-4)  || || 38,252 || 82-64 || Busch Stadium || L2 || bgcolor="ffbbbb"|-½
|- align="center" bgcolor="#ffbbbb"
| 147 || September 17 || @ Cardinals || 14-4 || Lohse (4-7) || Latos (14-7)  || || 37,806 || 82-65 || Busch Stadium || L3 || bgcolor="ffbbbb"|-½
|- align="center" bgcolor="bbffbb"
| 148 || September 18 || @ Cardinals || 8-4 ||Adams (4-1)  || McClellan (1-4) || || 40,205 || 83-65 || Busch Stadium || W1 || bgcolor="bbffbb"|+½
|- align="center" bgcolor="#ffbbbb"
| 149 || September 19 || @ Cardinals || 4-1 || Wainwright (19-11) || Garland (14-12) ||Franklin (25) || 37,885 || 83-66 || Busch Stadium || L1 || bgcolor="ffbbbb"|-½
|- align="center" bgcolor="bbffbb"
| 150 || September 21 || @ Dodgers || 6-0 ||Richard (13-8)  || Billingsley (11-11) || || 44,166 || 84-66 || Dodger Stadium || W1 || bgcolor="ffbbbb"|-½
|- align="center" bgcolor="bbffbb"
| 151 || September 22 || @ Dodgers || 3-1 || Stauffer (5-4) || Lilly (8-12) || Bell (43) || 33,728 || 85-66 || Dodger Stadium || W2 || bgcolor="bbffbb"|+½
|- align="center" bgcolor="#ffbbbb"
| 152 || September 23 || @ Dodgers || 3-1 || Kuroda (11-13) || Latos (14-8) ||Kuo (10) || 33,040 || 85-67 || Dodger Stadium || L1 || bgcolor="ffbbbb"|-½
|- align="center" bgcolor="bbffbb"
| 153 || September 24 || Reds || 4-3 || Gregerson (4-7) || Rhodes (4-4) || Bell (44) || 35,310 || 86-67 || Petco Park || W1 || bgcolor="ffbbbb"|-½
|- align="center" bgcolor="bbffbb"
| 154 || September 25 || Reds || 4-3 || Bell (6-0) || Chapman (1-2) || || 35,124 || 87-67 || Petco Park || W2 || bgcolor="bbffbb"|+½
|- align="center" bgcolor="#ffbbbb"
| 155 || September 26 || Reds || 12-2 || Bailey (4-3) || Richard (13-9) || || 26,131 || 87-68 || Petco Park || L1 || bgcolor="ffbbbb"|-½
|- align="center" bgcolor="#ffbbbb"
| 156 || September 27 || Cubs || 1-0 || Zambrano (10-6) || Stauffer (5-5) || Mármol (35) || 22,739 || 87-69 || Petco Park || L2 || bgcolor="ffbbbb"|-1
|- align="center" bgcolor="#ffbbbb"
| 157 || September 28 || Cubs || 5-2 || Dempster (15-11) || Latos (14-9) || Mármol (36) || 27,619 || 87-70 || Petco Park || L3 || bgcolor="ffbbbb"|-2
|- align="center" bgcolor="bbffbb"
| 158 || September 29 || Cubs || 3-0 || Young (2-0) || Wells (8-14) || Bell (45) || 29,400 || 88-70 || Petco Park || W1 || bgcolor="ffbbbb"|-2
|- align="center" bgcolor="#ffbbbb"
| 159 || September 30 || Cubs || 1-0 || Marshall (7-5) || Bell (6-1) || Mármol (37) || 28,576 || 88-71 || Petco Park || L1 || bgcolor="ffbbbb"|-3
|-

|- align="center" bgcolor="bbffbb"
| 160 || October 1 || @ Giants || 6-4 || Richard (14-9) || Cain (13-11)  || Heath Bell (46) || 42,409 || 89-71 || AT&T Park || W1 ||bgcolor="ffbbbb"|-2
|- align="center" bgcolor="bbffbb"
| 161 || October 2 || @ Giants || 4-2 || Stauffer (6-5) || Zito (9-14)  || Heath Bell (47) || 42,653 || 90-71 || AT&T Park || W2 ||bgcolor="ffbbbb"|-1
|- align="center" bgcolor="#ffbbbb"
| 162 || October 3 || @ Giants || 3-0 || Sánchez (13-9)   || Latos (14-10)  || Wilson (48)  || 42,822 || 90-72 || AT&T Park || L1 || bgcolor="ffbbbb"|-2
|-

Regular Season Schedule (calendar style) 
Regular Season Schedule (sortable text)

Roster

Player stats

Batting
Note: G = Games played; AB = At bats; R = Runs scored; H = Hits; 2B = Doubles; 3B = Triples; HR = Home runs; RBI = Runs batted in; AVG = Batting average; SB = Stolen bases

Pitching
Note: W = Wins; L = Losses; ERA = Earned run average; G = Games pitched; GS = Games started; SV = Saves; IP = Innings pitched; R = Runs allowed; ER = Earned runs allowed; BB = Walks allowed; K = Strikeouts

Farm system

References

External links

2010 San Diego Padres season at Baseball Reference
2010 San Diego Padres season Official Site

San Diego Padres seasons
San Diego Padres
San Diego Padres